This is a list of all the national forests in Liberia.

Forests

See also
Cape Mount Nature Conservation Unit
Wonegizi Nature Conservation Unit

References

External links
National forestry policy and implementation strategy
General Report on National Forest Inventory in Liberia: 1968
Protected areas of Liberia

National forests
Liberia
Liberia
National forestsN